Bill Hatanaka (born May 3, 1954) is a former Canadian football wide receiver who played four seasons in the Canadian Football League (CFL) with the Ottawa Rough Riders and Hamilton Tiger-Cats. He was drafted by the Rough Riders in the first round of the 1976 CFL Draft. He played CIS football at York University. He was a member of the Ottawa Rough Riders team that won the 64th Grey Cup. Hatanaka's punt return touchdown in the 64th Grey Cup was the first in Grey Cup history. He attended the Advanced Management Program at Harvard Business School, and is a member of the Board of Governors at York University.

Hatanaka serves as the chair of the Ontario Health agency's board of directors.

References

External links
Just Sports Stats
64th Grey Cup 79-Yard Punt Return Touchdown
Fanbase profile
Forbes profile

Living people
1954 births
Players of Canadian football from New Brunswick
Canadian football wide receivers
York Lions football players
Ottawa Rough Riders players
Hamilton Tiger-Cats players
People from Bathurst, New Brunswick
Canadian sportspeople of Japanese descent